Corn Chips is a 1951 Donald Duck cartoon made by the Walt Disney Animation Studios starring Donald Duck and the chipmunks Chip 'n' Dale. The film was released on March 23, 1951.

Plot
As Donald Duck is clearing snow from his house's walkway, he notices that chipmunks Chip 'n' Dale are busy clearing the snow off their branch. He pulls the branch down to the ground, fooling the chipmunks into clearing his path as well into a hydrant, and then walks into his house, laughing as the chipmunks realize the trick. Annoyed and angered, the chipmunks plan to teach him a lesson, and approach the house where they discover that Donald's trying to pop some popcorn which they plan to get steal and eat. While he goes out to collect some firewood, the chipmunks enter the house and try to eat the popcorn. They aren't able to chew it, and a frustrated Chip kicks some bits of corn into the fireplace, which pops. Donald returns and pops a bowl of popcorn with Chip & Dale inside, but they find a way to steal his bowl. The duck enters a fierce battle with the chipmunks for possession of the popcorn, including swapping its location, and a game of catch, which ends with Donald trying to burn down Chip and Dale's tree. The duo get the box of popcorn, and pour the entire box on the fire, causing a whole shower of popcorn to cover Donald's house. Concluding the short, a disgruntled Donald ends up having to clear popcorn out of his walkway.

Voice cast
 Donald Duck: Clarence Nash
 Chip: Jimmy MacDonald
 Dale: Dessie Flynn

Home media
The short was released on November 11, 2008 on Walt Disney Treasures: The Chronological Donald, Volume Four: 1951-1961.

References

1951 animated films
1951 short films
Donald Duck short films
1950s Disney animated short films
1950s English-language films
American animated short films
RKO Pictures short films
RKO Pictures animated short films
Films about ducks
Films about rodents
Films directed by Jack Hannah
Chip 'n' Dale films
Films scored by Oliver Wallace